The Ministry of Civil Affairs of Bosnia and Herzegovina is the governmental department which oversees civil affairs of the citizens of Bosnia and Herzegovina.

History
After the end of the Bosnian War in 1995, the 1996 Bosnian general election and the formation of the first post-war government in Bosnia and Herzegovina in 1997, the Ministry of Civil Affairs and Communications of Bosnia and Herzegovina began working with Spasoje Albijanić (SDS) at the head, which is the predecessor of today's Ministry of Communication and Traffic of Bosnia and Herzegovina and Ministry of Civil Affairs of Bosnia and Herzegovina.

After the 2002 Bosnian general election and the formation of the new government of Bosnia and Herzegovina between the Party of Democratic Action (SDA), the Serbian Democratic Party (SDS) and the Croatian Democratic Union of Bosnia and Herzegovina (HDZ BiH), headed by Adnan Terzić (SDA), the Ministry of Civil Affairs and Communications of Bosnia and Herzegovina was divided into the Ministry of Communication and Traffic of Bosnia and Herzegovina with Branko Dokić (PDP) becoming Minister and the Ministry of Civil Affairs of Bosnia and Herzegovina with Safet Halilović (SBiH) as Minister.

Organization
The Ministry of Civil Affairs of Bosnia and Herzegovina consists of nine organizational units and four commissions.
Sector for Legal, Personnel and General Affairs of Bosnia and Herzegovina
Sector for Financial and Material Affairs of Internal Support of Bosnia and Herzegovina
Sector for Citizenship and Travel Documents of Bosnia and Herzegovina
Sector for Labor, Employment, Social Protection and Pensions of Bosnia and Herzegovina
Health sector of Bosnia and Herzegovina
Sector for Education of Bosnia and Herzegovina
Sector for Science and Culture of Bosnia and Herzegovina
Sports sector of Bosnia and Herzegovina
Sector for Geodetic, Geological and Meteorological Affairs of Bosnia and Herzegovina
Demining Commission of Bosnia and Herzegovina
State Border Commission of Bosnia and Herzegovina
Commission for Coordination of Youth Issues in Bosnia and Herzegovina
State Commission for Cooperation of Bosnia and Herzegovina with UNESCO

List of ministers

Ministers of Civil Affairs and Communication (1997–2002)

Political parties:

Ministers of Civil Affairs (2002–present)

Political parties:

References

External links

Civil Affairs
Bosnia and Herzegovina
Bosnia and Herzegovina
Bosnia and Herzegovina, Civil Affairs
2002 establishments in Bosnia and Herzegovina